Noorder-Koggenland is a former municipality in the Netherlands, in the province of North Holland. Abbekerk, located in the municipality of Noorder-Koggenland, received city rights in 1414.

The municipality merged into Medemblik in 2007.

Population centres 
The municipality of Noorder-Koggenland consisted of the following cities, towns, villages and/or districts: Abbekerk, Benningbroek, Hauwert, Lambertschaag, Midwoud, Oostwoud, Opperdoes, Sijbekarspel, Twisk.

References 
 Statistics are taken from the SDU Staatscourant

Municipalities of the Netherlands disestablished in 2007
Former municipalities of North Holland
Medemblik